Olivier Fourdan is the creator of the Xfce desktop environment, for which development began at the end of 1996.

He started his career as a new technologies production engineer as well as in web development and embedded Linux systems. 

Fourdan has been working for Red Hat since 2007, interrupted by 2 years at Intel during 2013 and 2014. As of 2017, he is active in the adoption of Wayland, working on many different components, amongst them GTK, Mutter, GNOME Control Center, XWayland, and Mesa3D.

References 

French computer programmers
Free software programmers
Linux people
Living people
Year of birth missing (living people)
Red Hat employees
Xfce